Vasily Timofeyevich Volsky (Tula Province, Russia, 10 March 1897 – Moscow, Soviet Union, 22 February 1946) was a General of Soviet tank forces.

From 1939–1941, Volsky headed the Soviet Union's Academy of Mechanisation and Motorisation. He then rose to command the 4th Mechanised Corps, which he led at the Battle of Stalingrad in late 1942. Initially Volsky had concerns over the planned Operation Uranus, going as far as to write Joseph Stalin a personal letter "as a good communist" warning him that the attack would fail. After a meeting with Stalin, Volsky retracted his letter and the Corps assisted in the encirclement and destruction of the Romanian army commanded by Gebele.

During 1943, Volsky commanded the 3rd Guards Tank Corps; in 1944, promoted to Colonel General, he was appointed the commander of 5th Guards Tank Army, replacing Pavel Rotmistrov.

Volsky, suffering from tuberculosis, was hospitalized in March 1945. He died on 22 February 1946 in Moscow.

References
Stalingrad: The Fateful Siege (1999) by Antony Beevor.

Footnotes

Soviet colonel generals
Soviet military personnel of World War II
1897 births
1946 deaths
Military personnel from Moscow
Recipients of the Order of Lenin
Recipients of the Order of the Red Banner
Recipients of the Order of Suvorov, 1st class
Recipients of the Order of Suvorov, 2nd class
Russian military personnel of World War I
Imperial Russian Army personnel
Soviet military personnel of the Russian Civil War
20th-century deaths from tuberculosis
Tuberculosis deaths in the Soviet Union